Die Laune des Verliebten (The Mood of the One in Love) was Richard Wagner's first attempt at an opera project. Wagner wrote a scene for three female voices and a tenor aria before abandoning the project. There is no performance history for these fragments, and neither words nor music have survived.

Sources

Lost operas
Operas
Operas based on plays
Operas by Richard Wagner
Unfinished operas
Operas based on works by Johann Wolfgang von Goethe